This is a list of law enforcement agencies in the state of Alaska.

According to the US Bureau of Justice Statistics' 2008 Census of State and Local Law Enforcement Agencies, the state had 50 law enforcement agencies employing 1,298 sworn police officers, about 189 for each 100,000 residents.

State agencies 
 Alaska Department of Commerce, Community, and Economic Development
Alaska Alcohol and Marijuana Control Office
Alaska Department of Corrections
 Alaska Department of Environmental Conservation
 Alaska Department of Public Safety
Alaska State Crime Lab
Alaska State Fire Marshal's Office
Alaska State Troopers
Alaska Wildlife Troopers
Alaska Court Services Officers 
 Village Public Safety Officer Program
Alaska State Parks
 Alaska State Park Rangers
 Alaska Commercial Vehicle Enforcement
 Fairbanks International Airport Police and Fire Department
 Ted Stevens Anchorage International Airport Police and Fire Department

Borough agencies 

Bristol Bay Borough Police Department
North Slope Borough Police Department

City agencies 

 Adak Police Department
 Anchorage Police Department
Angoon Police Department
 Bethel Police Department
 Chignik Bay Department of Public Safety
 Cordova Police Department
 Craig Police Department
 Dillingham Police Department
 Fairbanks Police Department
 Fort Yukon Police Department
 Galena Police Department
Haines Police Department
Homer Police Department
 Hoonah Police Department
 Hooper Bay Police Department
 Juneau Police Department
 Kake Police Department
 Kenai Police Department
 Ketchikan Police Department
 King Cove Police Department
 Klawock Police Department
 Kodiak Police Department
 Kotzebue Police Department
Metlakatla Police Department
 Nome Police Department
 North Pole Police Department
 Palmer Police Department
 Petersburg Police Department
 Pilot Station Police Department
 Saint Mary's Police Department
 Saint Paul Department of Public Safety
 Sand Point Department of Public Safety
 Seldovia Police Department
 Seward Police Department
 Sitka Police Department
 Skagway Police Department
 Soldotna Police Department
 Tanana Department of Public Safety
Unalakleet Department of Public Safety
 Unalaska Department of Public Safety
 Valdez Police Department
Wasilla Police Department
 Whittier Police Department
 Wrangell Police Department
Yakutat Department of Public Safety

Other agencies 
 Alaska Railroad Corporation Police Department
 Office of the United States Marshal for the District of Alaska

University & College Agencies 
 University of Alaska Anchorage Police Department
 University of Alaska Fairbanks Police Department

References

Alaska
 
Law enforcement agencies